Keltz may refer to:
 Kielce, Poland
 Keltz Arena, a sports gymnasium for University of Montana Western 
 Jonathan Keltz, American actor
 James Keltz, husband to news reporter Jennie Bond
 Kelč, a town in the Czech Republic

See also
 Celts
 Keltzene, former name of Erzincan, a city in Turkey